The 2012 NRW Trophy was an international figure skating competition during the 2012–2013 season. An annual event organized by the Skating Union of North Rhine-Westphalia (NRW), it has been sanctioned by the Deutsche Eislauf Union and the International Skating Union since 2007. 

Medals were awarded in the disciplines of men's singles, ladies' singles, pair skating, and ice dancing. The competition was held in Dortmund, Germany in two parts. The Ice Dance Trophy, in which ice dancers compete on the senior, junior, and novice levels, will be held from 2–4 November 2012. The singles and pairs portion, also with senior, junior, and novice levels, was held from 5–9 December 2012. 2010 Olympic champion Yuna Kim of Korea made her return to competition at the event. The senior gold medals were won by Kim in the ladies' singles event, Germany's Aliona Savchenko / Robin Szolkowy in pairs, Russia's Konstantin Menshov in men's singles, and France's Pernelle Carron / Lloyd Jones in ice dancing.

Entries 
The entries were as follows.

Senior results

Men

Ladies

Pairs

Ice dancing

Junior results

Junior men 

16 total competitors

Junior ladies 

34 total competitors

Junior pairs 

8 teams in total

Junior ice dancing 

31 teams in total

Novice results

Advanced novice men 

14 total competitors

Advanced novice ladies 

27 total competitors

Advanced novice ice dancing 
 P1 = Pattern dance: Kilian
 P2 = Pattern dance: Blues

14 teams in total

References

External links 
 Official site of the NRW Trophy
 Results: Singles and Pairs
 Results: Ice dancing

2012
2012 in figure skating
NRW Trophy